Odd Couple is a 2022 Indian Hindi language film featuring Divyenndu, Vijay Raaz, Suchitra Krishnamoorthi, and Pranati Rai Prakash. It released directly on Amazon Prime Video, on 2nd August, 2022 to positive reviews. Odd Couple was featured at the Indian Film Festival of Ireland, Imagine India Madrid, South Asian International Film Festival New York, Jaipur International Film Festival, and many others.

Plot
Odd Couple is a story based on the modern relationships, values, and priorities in the midst of an exchange of marriage, caused by the registration authorities. The story speaks about their oddness and evenness towards age differences, love, cosmos, and uncertainty in life with the Freudian slip.

Cast
 Divyenndu as Piyush Kumar
 Suchitra Krishnamoorthi as Nivedita Verma
 Vijay Raaz as Yogesh Pant
 Pranati Rai Prakash as Nivedita 'Navi' Rao
 Manoj Pahwa as Magistrate/ Judge Choutala
 Kumar Rajput as Ganapathi Dhanush Katepalli Rao
 Saharsh Kumar Shukla as Driver Sudhir
 Sumit Gulati as Sunny
 Pradeep Singh Adhikari as Post Man
 Neha Negi
 Chunmun Yadav

References

External links 
 
 Odd Couple (2022) Cast - Actor, Actress, Director, Producer, Music Director
 Odd Couple Cast & Crew, Odd Couple Hindi Movie Cast and Crew, Actor, Actress

2022 drama films
2020s Hindi-language films
2022 films
2022 romantic comedy-drama films
Indian romantic comedy-drama films
Films set in Mumbai
Films about divorce
Comedy of remarriage films
Films about social issues
Indian courtroom films
Films about adultery in India